The Hospital Club, later renamed the H Club, was a members' club for people in the creative industries in London, England. It housed a television studio (h Studio), recording studio, screening room, live performance space, restaurant, lounges and gallery over seven floors. The club was located at 24 Endell Street, Covent Garden, on the site of an 18th-century hospital. 

The Hospital Club was used by the rock band Radiohead to record parts of their 2007 album In Rainbows and the 2008 live video In Rainbows – From the Basement.

In 2017, the Hospital Club opened a second location in the former Redbury Hotel in Hollywood, California. In 2020, both clubs closed permanently due to the effects of the COVID-19 pandemic and other "extenuating circumstances".

History

The Hospital Club London was founded in 2004 by Microsoft co-founder Paul Allen through his investment company Vulcan Inc. and musician David A. Stewart (formerly of the band Eurythmics).

For many years the building was home to St Paul's Hospital, first established in 1749.
 1749 — British Lying-In Hospital opened at 24 Endell Street
 1913 — British Lying-In Hospital closed
 1923 — St Paul's Hospital moves from Red Lion Square to 24 Endell Street 
 1992 — St Paul's Hospital closed
 1996 — Building purchased by Paul Allen, planning submitted. Local objections to development mean the project stalls for a number of years while a compromise with residents is worked out
 2004 — Private members' club, restaurant and recording studio open
2017 — the Hospital Club opens a second location in the former Redbury Hotel in Hollywood, California. 
 2020 — The club closed permanently due to the effects of the COVID-19 pandemic and other "extenuating circumstances".
 2021 — The contents of the London club were sold at auction on 15 September.

Food hygiene ratings
In 2014, the club received a zero rating for food hygiene after an inspection found mouse droppings in kitchens, prompting worries of cross-contamination. In 2015, the Hospital Club received a five-star rating by the Foods Standard Agency.

Television studio (h Studio)

The venue's  television studio is located two floors below ground level, and when it opened in 2003 was the first high-definition television studio in the UK.

The studio could accommodate an audience of approximately 200 people sitting or standing. The sound production room was upgraded in conjunction with Solid State Logic.

References

External links 

Television studios in London
Clubs and societies in London
Recording studios in London
Endell Street, London